Olmué is a Chilean town and commune located in the Marga Marga Province, Valparaíso Region. Olmué is located 42.8 miles northwest of Santiago and 42 kilometers east northeast of Valparaíso.

Olmué is the site of the Olmué Festival, a folk music contest held the 3rd week of January each year.

Demographics
According to the 2002 census of the National Statistics Institute, Olmué has 14,105 inhabitants (7,139 men and 6,966 women). Of these, 10,379 (73.6%) lived in urban areas and 3,726 (26.4%) in rural areas. The population grew by 11.9% (1,502 persons) between the 1992 and 2002 censuses. Olmué accounts for 1.10% of the regional population. The demonym for a man from Olmué is Olmueíno and Olmueína for a woman.

Administration
As a commune, Olmué is a third-level administrative division of Chile administered by a communal council, headed by an alcalde who is directly elected every four years. The current alcalde is Macarena Santelices Cañas (Ind./Pro-UDI)elected 2012. The communal council has the following members:
 Luís Alberto Córdova González (Ind./Pro-UDI)
 Sonia Muñoz Urrutia (PDC)
 Álvaro Zamora Pérez (PS)
 Abelardo Campos Cordero (RN)
 Leonel Gómez Órdenes (PRSD)
 Ramón Donoso Alvarado (UDI)

Within the electoral divisions of Chile, Olmué is represented in the Chamber of Deputies by Marcelo Schilling (PS) and Arturo Squella (UDI) as part of the 12th electoral district, (together with Limache, Villa Alemana and Quilpué). The commune is represented in the Senate by Ignacio Walker Prieto (PDC) and Lily Pérez San Martín (RN) as part of the 5th senatorial constituency (Valparaíso-Cordillera).

References

External links

  Municipality of Olmué
  Breaking news Santa Filomena, Pedro Aguirre Cerda

Populated places in Marga Marga Province
Communes of Chile